Juan Antonio Guajardo Anzaldúa (30 November 1958 – 29 November 2007) was a Mexican politician. Through his life he represented various political parties, although he  was never affiliated with one. He served as Deputy of the LVII and LIX Legislatures of the Mexican Congress as a plurinominal representative and briefly served as Senator in 1994. He also was Mayor of Río Bravo, Tamaulipas from 1993 to 1995 and from 2002 to 2003.

On 29 November 2007 Guajardo and five companions were murdered in an ambush in Río Bravo.

References

1958 births
2007 deaths
People from Reynosa
Members of the Senate of the Republic (Mexico)
Members of the Chamber of Deputies (Mexico)
Labor Party (Mexico) politicians
Mexican murder victims
Politicians killed in the Mexican Drug War
Assassinated Mexican politicians
Monterrey Institute of Technology and Higher Education alumni
20th-century Mexican politicians
21st-century Mexican politicians
Members of the Congress of Tamaulipas
Deaths by firearm in Mexico